Duvall is an unincorporated community in Pickaway County, in the U.S. state of Ohio.

History
A post office called Duvall was established in 1881, and remained in operation until 1955. Besides the post office, Duvall had a railroad station.

References

Unincorporated communities in Pickaway County, Ohio
Unincorporated communities in Ohio